Taralily is an annual rice harvest festival held on the island of Madagascar.

References

Festivals in Madagascar
Harvest festivals